SummerSlam Spectacular is a professional wrestling television program that was produced by the World Wrestling Federation (WWF). Three separate specials aired on the USA Network, one week prior to that years respective SummerSlam.

During this period of time, the WWF regularly ran specials to promote their pay-per-view events. Similar to this series, March to WrestleMania ran the week prior to that years WrestleMania and Survivor Series Showdown before Survivor Series.

SummerSlam Spectacular (1991)

SummerSlam Spectacular (1991) aired on the USA Network on August 18, 1991 (taped July 29, 1991) from the Centrum in Worcester in Worcester, Massachusetts.

SummerSlam Spectacular (1992)

SummerSlam Spectacular (1992) aired on the USA Network on August 23, 1992 (taped August 11, 1992) from the Nashville Municipal Auditorium in Nashville, Tennessee.

Although Bret Hart was the WWF Intercontinental Champion, his match against Skinner was a non-title match.

SummerSlam Spectacular (1993)

SummerSlam Spectacular (1993) aired on the USA Network on August 22, 1993 (taped August 16, 1993) from the Mid-Hudson Civic Center in Poughkeepsie, New York. In August 2019 the event was added to the WWE Network as part of the Hidden Gem section.

Although Yokozuna was the WWF World Heavyweight Champion, his match against Jim Duggan was a non-title match.

In the main event, tag team steel cage match for the WWF World Tag Team Championship, both members of the team needed to escape the cage in order to win. If one member of the team escaped the cage, he could re-enter.

References

SummerSlam
1991 in professional wrestling
1992 in professional wrestling
1993 in professional wrestling
USA Network original programming
Television series by WWE
1991 American television series debuts
1993 American television series endings